Luka Cerovina (born April 8, 2000) is a Serbian professional basketball player who currently plays for the Mega Basket of the ABA League.

Early career 
Cerovina started to play basketball for a youth system of his hometown team KK Polet. In 2016, he joined the youth system of Mega Basket from Belgrade. He won the 2017–18 Junior ABA League season for the Mega Bemax U19 team. Over six season games, he averaged 8.8 points, 5.5 rebounds and 2.8 assists per game.

Professional career 
Prior to the 2017–18 Serbian SuperLeague season, Cerovina was promoted to the Mega Bemax first team. On April 18, 2018, he made a debut and the first career start in a home win against Tamiš with ten points, five rebounds, and four assists.

National team career 
Cerovina was a member of the Serbian under-18 team that won the gold medal at the 2018 FIBA Europe Under-18 Championship in Latvia. Over seven tournament games, he averaged 1.8 points, 2.2 rebounds and 0.5 assists per game.

Cerovina was a member of the Serbian under-19 team that finished 7th at the 2019 FIBA Under-19 Basketball World Cup in Heraklion, Greece. Over seven tournament games, he averaged 4.9 points, 4.3 rebounds and 3.7 assists per game.

References

External links 
 Profile at euroleague.net
 Profile at realgm.com
 Profile at eurobasket.com

2000 births
Living people
ABA League players
Basketball League of Serbia players
KK Mega Basket players
OKK Beograd players
Serbian men's basketball players
Small forwards
Sportspeople from Kragujevac